Knutzon is a surname. Notable people with this surname include:

 Jason Knutzon (born 1976), American golfer
 Lars Knutzon (born 1941), Danish actor and director

See also
 Knutson
 Knutzen